Anthony Borden "Tony" Ward (born June 10, 1963) is an American model and actor.

Early life
Tony Ward was born in Santa Cruz, California on June 10, 1963 to Robert Borden Ward, from Kansas and Karen Elizabeth Castro of California. Ward is the second of three sons and spent his childhood mostly in San Jose before moving to Sonora where he graduated from high school. From there he moved to Los Angeles to pursue his dream of being an actor/model/dancer.
Tony was discovered by a scout while attending West Valley College in Saratoga, California and started modeling at age eighteen.

Modeling career
Ward began his modeling career in 1983 and achieved fame as an international supermodel, first for Calvin Klein underwear with images by Herb Ritts. Later he worked with photographers like Karl Lagerfeld, Steven Klein, Steven Meisel, Dimitris Theocharis, Terry Richardson and Rick Castro, (who had initially introduced him to Ritts) and for fashion designers such as Roberto Cavalli, Chanel, Dolce & Gabbana, Diesel, Fendi, H & M and Hugo Boss.

Ward is signed to DNA Model Management in New York City, Why Not Model Agency in Milan, Italy, Premier Model Management in London, Photogenics Model Management in Los Angeles, Unique Models in Copenhagen, and Bananas Models in Paris.

Ward has his own fashion brand SixInTheFace "Hand Ravaged Clothing by Mr. Ward".

Ward also shot for famed photographer Jim French of COLT Studio Group.

Acting career
In 1996, Ward had his first starring role in the movie Hustler White, directed by Bruce LaBruce and Rick Castro. In 1998, he appeared in Sex/Life in L.A. Jochen Hick's adult documentary about the sex lives of the guys who make L.A. adult movies. Ward reunited with LaBruce playing a homeless junkie in the 2010 zombie thriller L.A. Zombie.

Personal life

Ward was Madonna's boyfriend in the beginning of the 1990s and he appeared in some of her music videos as well as the controversial SEX book in 1992. Tony is also a painter and photographer and lives in Los Angeles. He is a father of three.

According to People on April 15, 1991, "Madonna and male model Tony Ward, 27, her last boyfriend of record and one of the objects of her desire in the "Justify" video, are no longer an item. It may be a coincidence, but he seems to have dropped from her arm at about the same time tabloids revealed that he had married an old flame, Greek-Australian photographer Amalia Papadimos, 23, in a quickie ceremony in Las Vegas on Aug. 21, 1990—after he had begun dating Madonna."

Filmography

Movies
 1996 - Hustler White by Bruce LaBruce and Rick Castro — lead role
 1998 - Sex Life in L.A. by Jochen Hick
 1999 - Out in Fifty by Bojesse Christopher and Scott Leet
 2002 - All about the Benjamins by Kevin Bray
 2007 - Story of Jen by François Rotger — lead role
 2010 - L.A. Zombie
 2010 - Out Getting Ribs
 2022 All Man: International Male
Videos
 1987 ABC - "King Without a Crown" (directors Vaughan Arnell and Anthea Benton)
 1988 Belinda Carlisle - "I Get Weak" (director Diane Keaton)
 1989 Madonna - "Cherish" (director Herb Ritts)
 1989 Taylor Dayne - "With Every Beat of My Heart" (director David Kellogg)
 1990 Madonna - "Justify My Love" (director - Jean Baptiste Mondino)
 1990 Tommy Page - "I'll Be Your Everything" (director Greg Masuak)
 1992 Madonna - "Erotica" (director Fabien Baron)
 1995 Rusty - "Misogyny" (director Bruce LaBruce)
 1996 George Michael - "Fastlove" (directors Vaughan Arnell and Anthea Benton)
 1996 Spice Girls - "Say You'll Be There" (director Vaughan Arnell)
 1999 Esthero - "That Girl" (director Patrick Hoelck)
 2000 Sinéad O'Connor - "Jealous" (director Mike Lipscombe)
 2005 Lisa Marie Presley - "Idiot" (director Patrick Hoelck)

See also
 List of male underwear models

References

1963 births
Living people
Male models from California
Bisexual male actors
LGBT models
Male actors from San Jose, California